Chuck Lambert is a former American football coach. Lambert was the head football coach at the Sterling College in Sterling, Kansas from 2016 to 2017. He was named to that position beginning with the 2016 season after his brother and former head coach, Andy Lambert, resigned to take the head coaching position at Southern Nazarene University.

Head coaching record

References

Year of birth missing (living people)
Living people
Sterling Warriors football coaches